The Khimik Stadium is a name of several sports facilities that during the times of Soviet Union belonged to the Khimik sports society. Itself Khimik means a chemist.

It may refer to:

Russia
Khimik Stadium (Dzerzhinsk), a stadium in Dzerzhinsk
Khimik Stadium (Kemerovo), a stadium in Kemerovo
 Khimik Stadium, a stadium in Yaroslavl in 1957–1960, today Shinnik Stadium

Ukraine
Khimik Stadium, a stadium in Armyansk
Khimik Sport Complex, a stadium in Chernihiv
Khimik Stadium, a stadium in Kalush
Khimik Stadium, a stadium in Krasnoperekopsk
Khimik Stadium, a stadium in Pervomaiskyi
Khimik Stadium, a stadium in Rivne
Khimik Stadium, a stadium in Severodonetsk
Khimik Stadium, a stadium in Slovyansk

Buildings and structures disambiguation pages